Lauzemis is a surname. Notable people with the surname include: 

Albert Lauzemis (1918–1944), German U-boat commander in World War II
Lena Lauzemis (born 1983), German actress